Lan Luang Road (sometimes Larn Luang) is a road in Bangkok, it runs in a short distance of just about 1.5 km (1,500 ft).

The road starts at Phan Fa Lilat Bridge straight to the east, cut across Krung Kasem Road and crossed canal Khlong Phadung Krung Kasem to meet three other roads Phitsanulok, Phetchaburi and Sawan Khalok at the Yommarat Intersection, where the Yommarat Railway Halt situated.

It was built in the reign of King Chulalongkorn (Rama V), about in the year 1903. The King named it Lan Luang, which means "royal nephew", because it runs through the palaces of the six princes (all of them are sons of Prince Chaturonrasmi, the King's younger brother). While the bridge across Khlong Phadung Krung Kasem was named the King, Chaturaphak Rangsarit.

Previously, the area the road passed was considered a suburb and was a place to raise the royal buffalo. Hence, the name Sanam Khwai Road or Sanam Krabue Road (buffalo field road) unofficially.

Between the beginning phase up till the Chaturaphak Rangsarit Bridge, it is also a borderline between Wat Sommanat (left side) and Khlong Maha Nak Subdistricts (right side) of Pom Prap Sattru Phai District. When crossing Khlong Phadung Krungkasem already therefore enters Si Yaek Maha Nak Subdistrict of Dusit District fully, before ends at Yommarat Intersection in the area of Suan Chitlada Subdistrict.

Renowned buildings along the road include Thai Airways Contact Center, Royal Princess Larn Luang Hotel, Varadis Palace, National Statistical Office (NSO), Maha Nak Market, Hall of Honour of The Prime Ministers & the National Council of Women of Thailand Under The Royal Patronage of Her Majesty The Queen (formerly Ban Managkasila), and Asia-Pacific International University: Bangkok Campus.

References

Streets in Bangkok
Pom Prap Sattru Phai district
Dusit district